Jennifer Eve Garth (born April 3, 1972) is an American actress. She is known for starring as Kelly Taylor throughout the Beverly Hills, 90210 franchise and Val Tyler on the sitcom What I Like About You (2002–06). In 2012, she starred in her own reality show, Jennie Garth: A Little Bit Country on CMT. Her memoir titled Deep Thoughts From a Hollywood Blonde was published by New American Library on April 1, 2014.

Early life
Garth was born in Urbana, Illinois, to John and Carolyn Garth. The youngest of seven children (though their only child together), Garth spent much of her youth on a 25-acre horse ranch between Sadorus and Arcola, Illinois. For a time the family stayed in Tuscola, Illinois; but eventually they settled in Glendale, Arizona, when Garth was around 13 years old. She studied dance and modeled, and was soon discovered at a local talent competition by Randy James, Hollywood scout and manager. She attended Greenway High School as a freshman and transferred to Apollo High School in her sophomore year. Determined to become an actress, Garth would receive audition materials from Los Angeles that she would work on with Jean Fowler, a local acting coach.  She left school during her junior year to work in Los Angeles with James and later obtained her high school diploma in California.

Career
In 1990, she landed the role of Kelly Taylor in the series Beverly Hills, 90210. Over the course of the series, Garth's character went through occasional rough times, and dealt with difficult issues in her personal life and with her family. Garth appears in all ten seasons of the show. She directed two episodes which was the second most of any cast member. She won a Young Artist Award and was nominated for a Teen Choice Award for the role. She was also instrumental in launching the spin-offs Melrose Place and 90210, with the character of Kelly becoming a continuity icon by appearing in the most franchise episodes.

Her successful role on Beverly Hills, 90210 opened the door to several lead roles in made-for-TV films in the 1990s, including Danielle Steel's Star (1993), Without Consent (1994), Lies of the Heart: The Story of Laurie Kellogg (1994), Falling for You (1995), and An Unfinished Affair (1996). She also had minor and supporting roles in the theatrical films Telling You (1998), My Brother's War (1997), and Power 98 (1996).

Garth ranked No. 59 on the FHM 100 Sexiest Women of 2000, and #93 on the magazine's 100 Sexiest Women of 2001.

In 2002, Garth co-starred with Amanda Bynes in the WB sitcom What I Like About You as Valerie Tyler. She and Bynes appeared on the show for all four seasons. The show centered around the relationship of the Tyler sisters, along with their friendships and romances. In 2003, she starred in the television movies The Last Cowboy and the Christmas family drama Secret Santa, playing a journalist. She and the cast of Secret Santa won the 2004 CAMIE Award.

In 2005, she voiced her Beverly Hills, 90210 character Kelly Taylor, as well as an additional role in the Family Guy Presents Stewie Griffin: The Untold Story, in the episode segment “Bango Was His Name-Oh!”. Garth also starred in the TV teen drama film Girl, Positive (2007), playing a teacher who was HIV positive. She and co-star Andrea Bowen (known for the series Desperate Housewives) each won a Prism Award for their performances. In 2007, Garth appeared on Dancing with the Stars: season five and was paired with Derek Hough. They reached the semi-finals in the competition.

In September 2008, Garth returned to the role of Kelly Taylor on the series premiere of The CW's spin-off series 90210. In the series, Garth's character, Kelly Taylor, is a Guidance Counselor at the fictional West Beverly High, where her half-sister Erin Silver attends. Kelly was reintroduced with a four-year-old son, whose father is ex-boyfriend Dylan McKay. The writers were eager to have her share scenes with former Beverly Hills, 90210 co-star Shannen Doherty, who reprised her role of Brenda Walsh.

On November 21, 2008, Garth appeared on the game show Are You Smarter than a 5th Grader?. She won $100,000 for her charity, the American Heart Association, for which she is spokeswoman for its "Go Red for Women" campaign. This TV show also noted that Garth owns a horse ranch in Santa Barbara, California. In 2009, she played the role of Natasha in Candace Bushnell's Web series of The Boardroom.  She also appeared in a cameo role on the December 7 episode of the children's television show Sesame Street, entitled "Mary Mary Quite Contrary". In January 2010, Garth starred in an iVillage web series created by NBC Universal, Garden Party, about farm life, fresh produce and healthy eating. On February 18, 2014, it was announced that production had started on The Jennie Garth Project, a ten-episode reality television series that aired on HGTV. It chronicled Garth as she renovated a home in Hollywood Hills, California for herself and her three children.

Garth released a memoir entitled Deep Thoughts from a Hollywood Blonde with Emily Heckman on April 1, 2014. On May 3, 2017, Garth launched MomGiftBox.com, "an online subscription box of products to indulge, inspire and pamper moms with every purchase benefiting a charity." Garth collaborated with Dune Jewelry and launched Travelling Heart Collection in February 2018.

Other ventures 
In 1993, she released a workout video titled Body In Progress. She has appeared in infomercials for Keurig Vue beverage brewer and Wen healthy hair care system, and commercials for migraine headaches and RAINN Crisis hotline. In 2004, she appeared in a print ad for Wish-Bone salad dressings as part of their $25,000 Kitchen Makeover contest. In 2012, she appeared in a television commercial for clothing retailer Old Navy with Beverly Hills, 90210 co-stars Luke Perry and Jason Priestley. She has graced the cover of numerous magazines, including Veronica, TV Guide, Woman's World, Health, Entertainment Weekly, Cookie, Sassy, Soap Opera Digest and People.

In November 2020, Garth began a podcast titled 9021OMG with Beverly Hills 90210 co-star Tori Spelling, where the two, along with TV and radio personality Sisanie Villaclara, share memories from their time on the show.

In February 2021, Garth won $168,000 on ABC's Celebrity Wheel of Fortune. Garth donated the money to Central Illinois Foodbank in Springfield, Illinois.

Personal life

Garth was married to musician Daniel B. Clark from 1994 to 1996.

In 1995, Garth met her second husband, actor Peter Facinelli, while filming the movie An Unfinished Affair. Garth and Facinelli married on January 20, 2001, in a traditional Roman Catholic wedding mass. They have three daughters; born in 1997, 2002, and 2006. In March 2012, Facinelli filed for divorce. The divorce was finalized in June 2013. Although there was no requirement to do so, Garth had converted to Catholicism when she married Facinelli.

Garth subsequently began dating actor David Abrams in the fall of 2014 after they met on a blind date, and they became engaged in April 2015. They married on July 11, 2015. Garth and Abrams separated in 2017. In April 2018, the couple filed for divorce. In February 2019, Garth appeared to have reconciled with Abrams filing a petition to dismiss the divorce proceedings.

In 2002 at age 30, Garth was diagnosed with a mitral valve prolapse and leaky heart valve, a condition she stated would require monitoring for the rest of her life. She revealed the diagnosis in 2009. "Down the road it’s something that could get more complicated or it could not," she commented. "People have had valve replacements and that kind of thing … but I’m prepared, that’s the key." She revealed in her memoir that she started suffering from anxiety at age 19, saying "I wouldn't say that I ever stepped over the line into full-blown agoraphobia, but I would say I definitely came close."

Filmography

Television

Film

Dancing with the Stars performances

In 2007, Garth appeared on season five of Dancing with the Stars and was paired with Derek Hough. They reached the semi-finals in the competition.

Awards and nominations

References

External links

 
 Dancing with the Stars profile

1972 births
Living people
20th-century American actresses
21st-century American actresses
Actresses from Illinois
Actresses from Phoenix, Arizona
American film actresses
American soap opera actresses
American television actresses
American women television producers
Former Roman Catholics
People from Urbana, Illinois
People with congenital heart defects
Television producers from Arizona
Television producers from Illinois